Peter Michael Cross (March 28, 1948 – January 2, 1977) was an American basketball player. Cross was drafted in the second round of the 1970 NBA draft by the Seattle SuperSonics. He played for Seattle as well as the Kansas City-Omaha Kings in the NBA. He played college basketball for the San Francisco Dons.

Career

A 6'9" center, Cross played collegiately for San Francisco. He was selected by  the Seattle SuperSonics in the second round of the 1970 NBA draft and the Kentucky Colonels in the 1970 American Basketball Association draft.

Cross played three seasons (1970–1973) in the National Basketball Association (NBA) as a member of the Seattle SuperSonics and Kansas City-Omaha Kings. His best NBA season was his first, in which he averaged eight points and twelve rebounds per game. His 12 rebounds per game in 1970–71 is still the SuperSonics' rookie record.

He played for the Iberia Superstars in the European Professional Basketball League in 1975.

Death
On January 2, 1977, Cross was found dead in his home in Redmond, Washington. His wife said that he had had epileptic seizures. He was 28.

Cross was posthumously inducted into the University of San Francisco Dons Hall of Fame (1979), and the Kern County Sports Hall of Fame (1993).

References

External links 

1948 births
1977 deaths
American expatriate basketball people in Spain
American men's basketball players
Basketball players from Washington (state)
Centers (basketball)
Kansas City Kings players
Kentucky Colonels draft picks
Power forwards (basketball)
San Francisco Dons men's basketball players
Seattle SuperSonics draft picks
Seattle SuperSonics players
Sportspeople from Redmond, Washington
Deaths from epilepsy
Neurological disease deaths in Washington (state)